Azli Yusof (Jawi: name ازلي يوسف; born 15 March 1967) is a Malaysian politician who has served as Member of Parliament (MP) for Shah Alam since November 2022. He served as Political Secretary to former Minister of Federal Territories and Shah Alam MP Khalid Abdul Samad from July 2018 to February 2020, Member of the Kuala Lumpur City Hall (DBKL) Advisory Board from 2018 to 2020, Member of the Shah Alam City Council (MBSA) from 2009 to 2012 and again from 2014 to 2015. He is a member of the National Trust Party (AMANAH), a component party of the Pakatan Harapan (PH) coalition. He has also served as Deputy State Chairman of AMANAH of Selangor since 2019 and Division Chief of AMANAH of Shah Alam since 2016. 

During his terms as both DBKL Advisory Board and MBSA Member, Azli involved in various key standing committees including Finance Committee, Engineering and Building Committee, One Stop Centre (OSC) Committee, Internal Audit and Assessment Committee, Smart Cities Committee and Licensing and Enforcement Committee. He also served as Chairman of Residence Representative Council for Zone 1 covering Section 2, 3, 4, 14 and Shah Alam City Centre and Zone 6 covering Section 17, 18 and Padang Jawa.

Background

Born 
 15 March 1967
 Sungai Besar, Selangor

Political Party 

 National Trust Party (AMANAH) (2015-present)
 Malaysian Islamic Party (PAS) (1991-2015)

Other Affiliations 

 Pakatan Harapan (2015-present)
 Malaysia Islamic Society of North America (MISNA) – (Co-Founder, 1990)
 Kuala Lumpur Football Association (KLFA), (Vice President, 2019-present)
 Muslim Care Malaysia Society (Co-Founder, 2005)
 Salam Relief (Co-Founder, 2014)

Spouse

Noraini Abu Bakar (Retired Teacher) 

 SMK Seksyen 9 Shah Alam (last school before retirement)
 Council Member Mesyuarat Masjid Negeri Selangor
 Assistant Secretary of Persatuan Muballighat Negeri Selangor (until June 2022)

Children 
4

Occupation 
Director of Project Southeast Asia Region, DEXION ASIA

Education 
Azli obtained his BSc in Engineering Management from University of Missouri-Rolla USA (1990), and MBA in Logistics Management from UNISEL (2010).

Career 
Azli has over 25 years of global industry experience in project management & industrial design in construction industry and logistics. He is tasked to handle combined projects worth more than RM100 million a year serving as Director of Southeast Asia Region with DEXION ASIA.

Community, Social and Humanitarian involvement 
Azli was appointed as Nazir of Masjid Jamek Tun Raja Uda, Section 16 Shah Alam in 2012, and Imam for Surau At-Taqwa Section 7 Shah Alam. He was also founder and member of Board of Trustees for Sekolah Rendah Islam Pintar, Shah Alam since 1999. He co-founded Muslim Care Malaysia, a borderless humanitarian NGO in 2005 and later in 2014 he co-founded Salam Relief which is also another humanitarian- based NGO. He is actively involved in various domestic humanitarian activities in Shah Alam as well as throughout Selangor and other States. He also participated in international relief missions such as during Tsunami in Acheh, Sumatera and earthquake in Bantul Jogjakarta.

Election results

Source 
Official Website

Living people
1967 births
Malaysian politicians
Missouri University of Science and Technology alumni